Camillo Ranzani (22 June 1775 – 23 April 1841, Bologna ) was an Italian priest and a naturalist. He was director of the Museum of Natural History of Bologna from 1803 to 1841 (now the Museum of Comparative Anatomy, one of the museums of the University of Bologna). Ranzani wrote Elementi di zoologia which was published in Bologna from 1819 to 1825.

Taxa
Animals named in honour of Ranzani include:
 Ranzania Nardo, 1840, a genus of sunfish 
Cymatium ranzanii (Bianconi, 1850), a species of predatory sea snail

See also
:Category:Taxa named by Camillo Ranzani

References

External links

BHL Digitised Elementi di zoologia

Italian zoologists
19th-century Italian Roman Catholic priests
Scientists from Bologna
1775 births
1841 deaths
Clergy from Bologna